Grabarz is a surname. Notable people with the surname include:

Joseph Grabarz (born 1956), American politician
Robbie Grabarz (born 1987), British high jumper